A consistent pricing process (CPP) is any representation of (frictionless) "prices" of assets in a market.  It is a stochastic process in a filtered probability space  such that at time  the  component can be thought of as a price for the  asset.  

Mathematically, a CPP  in a market with d-assets is an adapted process in  if Z is a martingale with respect to the physical probability measure , and if  at all times  such that  is the solvency cone for the market at time .

The CPP plays the role of an equivalent martingale measure in markets with transaction costs. In particular, there exists a 1-to-1 correspondence between the CPP  and the EMM .

References

Financial risk modeling
Mathematical finance